Nippoptilia issikii is a moth of the family Pterophoridae, that is known from Japan (Hokkaido), and Korea and China.

The larvae feed on the fruit of Vitis vinifera.

References

External links
Taxonomic And Biological Studies Of Pterophoridae Of Japan (Lepidoptera)
Japanese Moths
A taxonomic review of the genus Nippoptilia (Lepidoptera: Pterophoridae) from Korea, with description of a new species

Platyptiliini
Moths described in 1961
Moths of Asia